Typha alekseevii  is a plant species native to the Caucasus Region (Armenia, Azerbaijan, Georgia and southern European Russia). It grows in freshwater marshes.

References

alekseevii
Freshwater plants
Flora of Armenia
Flora of Azerbaijan
Flora of Georgia (country)
Flora of Russia
Plants described in 1999